Bhanwar is a 1976 Bollywood film directed by Bhappi Sonie. The film stars Ashok Kumar, Randhir Kapoor and Parveen Babi.

Cast
Ashok Kumar as Dr. Verma 
Randhir Kapoor as Anup  
Parveen Babi as Roopa
Aruna Irani as Anju Verma
Ranjeet as Ravi 
Madan Puri as John D'Souza "Johny"
Kamini Kaushal as Rosy D'Souza 
Asrani as Prabhu Singh 
Arpana Choudhary as Leela
Nadira as Sharda 
Dhumal as Chaudhary Phuliaram 
Brahm Bhardwaj as Dr. Gupta 
Sulochana Chatterjee as Sister

Soundtrack

External links

References

1976 films
1970s Hindi-language films
Films scored by R. D. Burman
Films directed by Bhappi Sonie